Freeman is an unincorporated community in Kane County, in the U.S. state of Illinois.

History
Freeman was named for John Freeman, the original owner of the land where the town was built.

References

Unincorporated communities in Kane County, Illinois
Unincorporated communities in Illinois